Claytoven Richardson (born 1956, in Berkeley, California) is an American singer, instrumentalist, producer, songwriter, and author.

Biography

Born Clayton D. Richardson on May 23, 1956. Larry Batiste, a childhood friend (and later business partner), accidentally fused his given name with that of the famous composer to form the name "Claytoven."

Career
His musical career spans nearly three decades, during which he has been awarded several gold, platinum and multi-platinum awards.

In 1979 Claytoven made his recording studio and recording artist debut as a part of the group Bill Summers and Summers Heat. The group recorded one album for Prestige Records and three albums for MCA Records. The group saw moderate success with the songs, "Call It What You Want" and "Jam The Box".

After Summers Heat, Claytoven went on to become a session musician with his first major start singing background vocals for producer Narada Michael Walden on the hit George Benson single "Kisses in the Moonlight". His second recording session was as a guest vocalist and background vocalist on the breakout album "Duotones" for saxophonist, Kenny G. He has since performed on numerous gold and platinum recordings featuring Tevin Campbell, Michael Bolton, Elton John, Peabo Bryson, New Kids on the Block, Ricky Martin, Whitney Houston, Mariah Carey, Jennifer Lopez, Aretha Franklin, Natalie Cole, Celine Dion, and many others.

After being in the music business for some time he realized a need to increase the pool of well trained professional vocalists. So in 2000 Claytoven also stepped into the role of teacher by founding the "Studio Training Workshop for Vocalists", a workshop designed to help aspiring singers pursue a career as a professional recording vocalist by bridging the gap between the academic and professional music worlds. He currently teaches this and other workshops at San Francisco State University Music/Recording Industry Program and for various other music programs across the country. He now works for the City of Oakland running a local teen center, Digital Arts and Culinary Academy (DACA), along with fellow co-director and musician Andrea President.

In his efforts to further create growth in the professional music community he has also penned the book, "The Professional Studio Vocalist". Though he is involved with many educational and literary projects, he remains active as a session musician.

Selected discography
Discography References,

Artist albums

Session work

Soundtracks

References

American rhythm and blues singers
American dance musicians
1956 births
Musicians from Berkeley, California
Living people
Singers from California
21st-century African-American male singers
20th-century African-American male singers